This is a list of notable Korean Canadians, including both Canadian citizens and residents.

By profession

Academics

Dr Jong Soo Park – Dalhousie biologist who found world's oldest known DNA
Im-hak Ree – mathematician who developed Ree group
Jin-me Yoon – educator and artist

Actors & Actresses

Ahn Hyo-seop - actor (Abyss (TV series))
Andrea Bang - actress (Kim's Convenience)
Diana Bang - actress
Jasper Cho - actor (Descendants of the Sun)
Ins Choi - actor, playwright and screenwriter (Kim's Convenience)
Choi Woo-shik - actor (Parasite) 
Choi Yeo-jin – actress
 Tina Jung - actress (Strays, Make It Pop)
Julien Kang – actor
Lee Jae-yoon - actor (Weightlifting Fairy Kim Bok-joo)
Paul Sun-Hyung Lee - actor (Kim's Convenience)
Sandra Oh – actress (Double Happiness, Sideways, Grey's Anatomy and Killing Eve)
Grace Park – actress (Battlestar Galactica and Hawaii Five-0)
Anthony Shim - actor, filmmaker
Jean Yoon - actress (Kim's Convenience), writer, poet and playwright

Artists

 Michael Cho – illustrator and cartoonist
 Ann Y. K. Choi - author
 June Hur - author
 Bryan Lee O'Malley – cartoonist

Humanitarian
Choong Lim Chun - journalist and humanitarian who reunited divided families
Hyeon Soo Lim - pastor who was detained in North Korea

Athletes

Tommy Chang (martial artist) - Master of Hapkido/Taekwondo and stunt performer
Denis Kang – mixed martial artist
Gail Kim – professional wrestler
Jung-Yul Kim - former football player for the Calgary Stampeders and Toronto Argonauts
Michael Kim (footballer) - soccer manager, assistant manager for the South Korea national football team
Jim Paek – former National Hockey League player
Park Jong Soo - South Korean master of taekwondo

Media

Ben Chin – news anchor
Ins Choi – actor and playwright
Nathalie Chung – journalist and news anchor
Evan Fong – entertainer and YouTuber
Tanya Kim – co-host of CTV's ETalk
Jee Yun Lee – news anchor
Mi-Jung Lee – anchor and producer
Min Reyes – political commentator and activist  
Albert Shin - filmmaker
Jenny Heijun Wills - writer, university professor
Celeste Yim - comedian, writer for Saturday Night Live

Jacob Bae - a member of The Boyz (South Korean band)
Paul Blanco - Korean hip-hop musician and producer
Alex Chu – actor and a member of Clazziquai
Trish Doan – bass player for the metal band Kittie
DinDin - Korean hip-hop musician
G.NA – Korean Pop singer
Jeon So-mi – a former member of I.O.I and soloist
Earl Lee - RBC Resident Conductor, Toronto Symphony Orchestra
Mark Lee – rapper of NCT 
Kevin Moon – a member of The Boyz (South Korean band)
Ryu Sera – a former member of Nine Muses
Sik-K - Rapper signed to Jay Park's international hip - hop label  H1GhR Music
Wendy Shon – raised in Canada, the main vocalist of Red Velvet
Wonny Song – classical pianist
Tablo – a member of Epik High
Yejin – a former member of Brave Girls
Keeho - a member of P1Harmony
Young K – a member of Day6 (bassist and vocalist) and songwriter
Junny - soloist (R&B Singer) and songwriter

Politicians

Raymond Cho – Legislative Assembly of Ontario MPP
Stan Cho – Legislative Assembly of Ontario MPP
Steve Kim - City of Coquitlam Councillor
Sandy Lee – Northwest Territories MLA
Yonah Kim Martin – British Columbia Senator
Jane Shin – British Columbia MLA
Nelly Shin - MP for Port Moody—Coquitlam

References

Korean
Canada

Korean
Korean